Vikramaditya was a legendary emperor of ancient India. 

Vikramaditya may also refer to:

People
 Chandragupta Vikramaditya (Chandragupta II), the 375–415 CE Gupta king
 Yasodharman of Malwa (6th century); adopted the title Vikramaditya
 Vikramaditya I (655–680), Chalukya king
 Vikramaditya II (733–744), Chalukya king
 Vikramaditya V (1008–1015), Chalukya king
 Vikramaditya VI (1076–1126), Chalukya king
 Hemachandra Vikramaditya (Hemu), 16th-century Hindu king
 Vikramaditya, Tamil actor

Other uses
 INS Vikramaditya, Kiev-class aircraft carrier of the Indian Navy
 Vikramaditya (film), a 1945 Hindi historical drama film